Thaia may refer to:
 Thaia (leafhopper), a leafhopper genus in the tribe Erythroneurini
 Thaia (plant), a genus of flowering plants in the family Orchidaceae

See also
Taia (disambiguation)